Psychological first aid (PFA) is a technique designed to reduce the occurrence of post-traumatic stress disorder. It was developed by the National Center for Post Traumatic Stress Disorder (NC-PTSD), a section of the United States Department of Veterans Affairs, in 2006. It has been endorsed and used by the International Federation of Red Cross and Red Crescent Societies, Community Emergency Response Team (CERT), the American Psychological Association (APA) and many others. It was developed in a two-day intensive collaboration, involving more than 25 disaster mental health researchers, an online survey of the first cohort that used PFA and repeated reviews of the draft.

Definition 
According to the NC-PTSD, psychological first aid is an evidence-informed modular approach for assisting people in the immediate aftermath of disaster and terrorism to reduce initial distress and to foster short and long-term adaptive functioning. It was used by non-mental health experts, such as responders and volunteers. Other characteristics include non-intrusive pragmatic care and assessing needs. PFA does not necessarily involve discussion of the traumatic event and avoids any activity associated with "debriefing" as that technique has been associated with increased rates of PTSD.

Components 
 Protecting from further harm
 Opportunity to talk without pressure
 Active listening
 Compassion
 Addressing and acknowledging concerns
 Discussing coping strategies
 Social support
 Offer to return to talk
 Referral

Steps 
 Contact and engagement
 Safety and comfort
 Stabilization
 Information gathering
 Practical assistance
 Connection with social supports
 Coping information
 Linkage with services

History 
Before PFA, there was a procedure known as debriefing.  Debriefing was a necessary step in a commercially available training intended to reduce PTSD called "Critical Incident Stress Management" (CISM) . It was intended to reduce the incidence of post traumatic stress disorder (PTSD) after a major disaster. PTSD is now widely known to be debilitating; sufferers experience avoidance, flashbacks, hyper-vigilance, and numbness. Debriefing procedures were made a requirement after a disaster, with a desire to prevent people from developing PTSD. The idea behind it was to promote emotional processing by encouraging recollection of the event. Debriefing has origins with the military, where sessions were intended to boost morale and reduce distress after a mission, however the US Department of Defense discontinued the practice in 2002 due to evidence indicating that the practice increased PTSD rates. Debriefing was done in a single session with seven stages: introduction, facts, thoughts and impressions, emotional reactions, normalization, planning for future, and disengagement.

Debriefing was found to be at best, ineffective, and at worst, harmful with some studies finding that PTSD rates actually increased as a result of debriefing. There are several theories as to why debriefing increased incidence of PTSD. First, those who were likely to develop PTSD were not helped by a single session. Second, being re-exposed too soon to the trauma could lead to retraumatization. Exposure therapy in cognitive behavioral therapy allows the person to adjust to the stimuli before slowly increasing severity. Debriefing did not allow for this. Also, normal distress was seen to be pathological after a debriefing and those who had been through a trauma thought they had a mental disorder because they were upset. Debriefing assumes that everyone reacts the same way to a trauma, and anyone who deviates from that path, is pathological. But there are many ways to cope with a trauma, especially so soon after it happens.

PFA seems to address many of the issues in debriefing. It is not compulsory and can be done in multiple sessions and links those who need more help to services. It deals with practical issues which are often more pressing and create stress. It also improves self-efficacy by letting people cope their own way. PFA has attempted to be culturally sensitive, but whether it is or not has not been shown. However, a drawback is the lack of empirical evidence. While it is based on research, it is not proven by research. Like the debriefing method, it has become widely popular without testing, however debriefing is linked to harmful outcomes whereas PFA specifically avoids debriefing.

Notes

References 
 
 
 
 
 
 
 
 
 Uhernik & Husson. 2009. PFA: "Evidence Informed Approach for Acute Disaster Behavioral Health Response". Compelling Counseling Interventions. 271–280.
 

Preventive medicine